In group theory, the correspondence theorem (also the lattice theorem, and variously and ambiguously the third and fourth isomorphism theorem) states that if  is a normal subgroup of a group , then there exists a bijection from the set of all subgroups  of  containing , onto the set of all subgroups of the quotient group .

Specifically, if 
 G is a group, 
 , a normal subgroup of G, 
 , the set of all subgroups A of G that contain N, and 
 , the set of all subgroups of G/N, 

then there is a bijective map  such that
  for all 

One further has that if A and B are in  then
  if and only if ;
 if  then , where  is the index of A in B (the number of cosets bA of A in B);
  where  is the subgroup of  generated by  
 , and 

This list is far from exhaustive. In fact, most properties of subgroups are preserved in their images under the bijection onto subgroups of a quotient group.

A proof of the correspondence theorem can be found here.

Similar results hold for rings, modules, vector spaces, and algebras.

See also 
 Modular lattice

References

Isomorphism theorems